Jędrzejów Abbey is a former Cistercian abbey founded in the 12th century in Poland. The town of Jędrzejów grew around it. Blessed Polish bishop of Kraków and historian, Wincenty Kadłubek, lived in this monastery for 5 years and was buried there. In the 15th century, the sculptor Veit Stoss worked there.

External sources

Churches in Poland
Cistercian monasteries in Poland
Christian monasteries established in the 12th century
Romanesque architecture in Poland
Jędrzejów County
Buildings and structures in Świętokrzyskie Voivodeship
Churches in Świętokrzyskie Voivodeship